Colegio de Ingenieros is a Caracas Metro station on Line 1. It was opened on 27 March 1983 as part of the extension of Line 1 from La Hoyada to Chacaíto. The station is between Bellas Artes and Plaza Venezuela.

References

Caracas Metro stations
1983 establishments in Venezuela
Railway stations opened in 1983